Thule Group AB is a Swedish company that owns brands related to outdoor and transportation products. These include cargo carriers for automobiles and other outdoor and storage products, with 4,700 points of sale in 136 countries worldwide.

History

Thule was founded in 1942 in Hillerstorp, southern Sweden. The company grew steadily, especially in the 1960s when Thule specialized in roof racks and other automobile accessories helping car owners bring along their outdoor equipment and luggage. In 1979, Thule was sold to Eldon, a company listed on the Stockholm Stock Exchange, which continued to develop the company. In 1999 Eldon was acquired by the private equity firm EQT and delisted. Thule was then sold to the UK-based private equity firm Candover in 2004, which embarked on several mergers and acquisitions, growing the turnover more than three times and adding new product lines such as towbars, car trailers, snow chains, RV products and bags for electronic devices.

Thule was acquired by Nordic Capital in May 2007 but forced into a restructuring in December 2008 at the height of the Global Financial Crisis, resulting in the lending bank consortium receiving an equity stake in the company. Nordic Capital acquired the remainder of the company in December 2010 and listed Thule on the Stockholm Stock Exchange in November 2014 through an IPO.

Thule Group has an annual tradition of donating backpacks and school supplies to the children of Casa de la Esperanza, an award-winning housing program for migrant farm workers and their families in the US. 
Since 2010, Thule Group has been the main sponsor of RBU, Sweden’s National Association for Disabled Children and Adolescents.

Products
Thule is the largest and most well-known of the brands that make up the group. The Thule product line includes everything from car roof boxes, bike racks, roof racks and strollers to laptop and camera bags, tablet and mobile phone cases, backpacks, luggage and roof top tents.
The other brands that form the Thule Group brand portfolio are the US-founded cover and bag company Case Logic, SportRack Inc., the Canadian brand Chariot, the Dutch company Yepp and the Californian company Tepui.

Timeline
 1962 – Introduction of Thule sport and cargo carriers
 2004 – Acquisition of König (snow chains)
 2005 – Acquisition of Omnistor (RV products), rebranded Thule 2009
 2005 – Acquisition of Sportworks car rack product line
 2007 – Acquisition of Case Logic (bags for electronic devices), premium line rebranded Thule 2010
 2007 – Acquisition of UWS (work gear)
 2011 – Acquisition of Chariot Carriers, rebranded Thule in 2013
 2011 – Opening of Thule Store near Mobilia shopping center in Malmö, on the premises that previously housed the old stocking factory Malmö Strumpfabrik.
 2013 – Introduction of Thule sport and travel bags
 2014 – The towbar and trailer businesses are divested
 2015 – The snow chain business (König) is divested
 2016 – Acquisition of GMG B.V. (Yepp child bike seats)
 2017 – UWS is divested
 2018 (Feb) – Opening of Thule Store in Stockholm
 2018 (Dec) – Acquisition of the North American rooftop tents company Tepui Outdoors Inc.

References 

Manufacturing companies of Sweden
Manufacturing companies established in 1942
Companies based in Malmö
Swedish brands
Swedish companies established in 1942